Ochrocesis evanida is a species of beetle in the family Cerambycidae. It was described by Pascoe in 1867. It is known from Borneo and Malaysia. It contains the varietas Ochrocesis evanida m. nigroabdominalis.

References

Astathini
Beetles described in 1867